HEPES (4-(2-hydroxyethyl)-1-piperazineethanesulfonic acid) is a zwitterionic sulfonic acid buffering agent; one of the twenty Good's buffers. HEPES is widely used in cell culture, largely because it is better at maintaining physiological pH despite changes in carbon dioxide concentration (produced by aerobic respiration) when compared to bicarbonate buffers, which are also commonly used in cell culture.  Lepe-Zuniga et al. reported an unwanted photochemical process wherein HEPES when exposed to ambient light produces hydrogen peroxide, which is not a problem in bicarbonate-based cell culture buffers. It is therefore strongly advised to keep HEPES-containing solutions in darkness as much as possible to prevent oxidation. 

HEPES has the following characteristics: 
 pKa1 (25 °C) = 3
 pKa2 (25 °C) = 7.5
 Useful pH range = 2.5 to 3.5 or 6.8 to 8.2

HEPES has negligible metal ion binding, making it a good choice as a buffer for enzymes which might be inhibited by metal chelation.

See also
CAPS
CHES
MOPS
HEPPS
MES
HEPBS
PIPES
Common buffer compounds used in biology

References

Primary alcohols
Piperazines
Buffer solutions
Sulfonic acids
Ethanolamines